Allen Edgar Broussard (April 13, 1929 – November 5, 1996) was an American attorney who rose to become an associate justice of the California Supreme Court from July 22, 1981, to August 31, 1991.

Biography
Broussard was born in Lake Charles, Louisiana, the son of Clemire and Eugenia Broussard (née Rochon). At the age of sixteen, he moved with his family to California, where his father was a longshoreman, and his mother worked as a seamstress.  His parents were of Creole ancestry.

As a young man, Broussard held various part-time jobs, including selling shoes and working in a canning plant. He financed his own education, first at San Francisco City College, then the University of California at Berkeley, and the University of California, Berkeley School of Law. At Boalt, he was vice-president of the Boalt Hall Law Students Association and a contributor to the California Law Review.

After graduating in 1953, he served in the United States Army for two years. After completing Basic Army Administration school as a clerk typist, he became a Chaplain's assistant in Germany, where he served for 19 months. After leaving the Army, he became the research attorney for Raymond E. Peters, Presiding Justice of the California Court of Appeal, First District, Division One.  In 1959, Broussard entered private practice with Wilson, Metoyer & Sweeny.

Broussard was one of a group of influential African American leaders in East Bay politics, including Norvel Smith, and state Court of Appeal Justice Clinton White. He was part of a coterie that used to meet at the pharmacy of William Byron Rumford, along with Lionel Wilson. In 1972, Broussard was the first African American to be elected President of the California Judges Association. He also became Chairman of the Board of the Center for Judicial Education and Research.

After retiring from the judiciary, Broussard served on the Oakland Port Commission, which involved visiting ports around the world, especially Asia. In 1987, he led a group of 72 lawyers, port officials including: port commissioner Carole Ward Allen, and city officials on a 3-week long trip to China meeting the Mayor of Shanghai, Jiang Zemin. Shanghai is a "twin city" of San Francisco.

Judicial career
Broussard was one of the first African-Americans to become a judge in California. In 1964, California Governor Edmund G. "Pat" Brown appointed Broussard as a judge of the Municipal Court for the Oakland-Piedmont (later Oakland-Piedmont-Emeryville) Judicial District. His record caught the attention of Democratic Governor Jerry Brown, who, in 1975, appointed Broussard as a judge of the Superior Court of Alameda County. He went on to serve as Presiding Judge of the Superior Court.  In 1981 Governor Jerry Brown elevated Broussard to the California Supreme Court, where he served as Associate Justice until 1991. His term followed Wiley Manuel, who was on the bench 1977-1981.

On the court, Broussard was a leading liberal in the court's majority, along with Chief Justice Rose Bird.  He wrote the majority of opinions for the court at that time.  By 1982, five of the seven justices on the court were Brown appointees, who were widely criticized as allegedly soft on crime and overly political.  Even though the judges had different individual philosophies, they were lumped together by conservative politicians who derisively labeled them as "Jerry's Judges" and "Rosie & The Supremes."  Critics repeatedly claimed that Broussard and other Brown appointees ruled on the basis of personal opinion and political bias rather than the law and the state Constitution.

In 1982, Broussard was up for election reconfirmation.  A campaign was waged against him and the other Brown appointees on the ballot that year (Cruz Reynoso and Otto Kaus), something that was unprecedented in California history.  Broussard was reconfirmed to a 12-year term, as expected, with 56% of the vote, but that was below the typical confirmation vote.  In 1986, three of his colleagues (Bird, Cruz Reynoso, and Joseph Grodin) were resoundingly voted off the court, and they were replaced by conservative justices. Broussard was disturbed by this development and expressed fear that the judiciary would become politicized.

On August 31, 1991, Broussard retired from the court and Governor Pete Wilson appointed Ronald M. George to the seat.

Personal life
As chairman of a civic organization called Men of Tomorrow, he contacted Odessa Monroe, the program director of the radio station KSAN, seeking free air time. He went on to marry her in 1959, and they had two sons, Keith and Craig.

References

Selected publications

Papers and oral history
 A California Supreme Court justice looks at law and society, 1964–1996: Allen E. Broussard oral history transcript. (1997). Interview by Gabrielle Morris. Bancroft Library, Regional Oral History Office, via Calisphere.
 Allen Broussard Papers. California Judicial Center Library, Special Collections and Archives. Online Archives of California.

External links
 In Memoriam: Honorable Allen E. Broussard (1929–1996). California Supreme Court Historical Society.
 California Supreme Court opinions authored by Allen Broussard. Courtlistener.com.
 Past & Present Justices. California State Courts. Retrieved July 19, 2017.

See also
 List of African-American jurists
 List of justices of the Supreme Court of California
 Wiley Manuel
 Lionel Wilson
 Carole Ward Allen
 Janice Rogers Brown
 Jami Floyd
 Vaino Spencer

1929 births
1996 deaths
Politicians from Lake Charles, Louisiana
American jurists
African-American judges
African-American lawyers
City College of San Francisco alumni
University of California, Berkeley alumni
UC Berkeley School of Law alumni
20th-century American judges
Superior court judges in the United States
Justices of the Supreme Court of California
California Democrats
African-American people in California politics
Lawyers from Oakland, California
United States Army soldiers
African-American history in Oakland, California
20th-century American lawyers
20th-century African-American people